David Newton Sheldon (June 26, 1807 – October 4, 1889) was the fifth President of Colby College, Maine, United States from 1843–1853. He was also a pastor, missionary, and educator.

Early life
Sheldon was born in Suffield, Connecticut, to David and Elizabeth Hall. He was educated at Williams College, where he graduated as the valedictorian of the class of 1830 and was inducted into the Phi Beta Kappa Society. He was a tutor for one year before entering the Andover Newton Theological School and graduating in 1835. He married Rachael Hobart Ripley in Chelsea, Massachusetts on October 15, 1835, with whom he ultimately had five children.

Career
Sheldon was a Baptist missionary in France from 1835-1839, and a pastor in Halifax, Nova Scotia, before coming to Waterville, Maine in 1842, where he was a pastor and a French Teacher at Colby College. Beginning in 1843, he was the president of the college and Professor of Intellectual and Moral Philosophy.  At least in part due to his liberal inclination towards Free Will Baptist theology, the Calvinistic Baptists who founded the college forced him out in 1853, after years of declining enrollments. He received an honorary Doctor of Divinity degree from Brown University in 1847. He held various pastorships in Bath, Maine, including as a Unitarian from 1853-1862 before returning to Waterville, where he continued as a Unitarian pastor until 1879.

Sheldon died at his home in Waterville on October 4, 1889.

Published works
Sin and Redemption, 1856

References

1807 births
1889 deaths
Colby College faculty
People from Suffield, Connecticut
Presidents of Colby College
Brown University alumni
Williams College alumni